The Pen, or PEN series is a brand of Olympus. It was used on analog half-frame compact and SLR models from 1959 until the early 1980s. In 2009, Olympus released the PEN E-P1, a digital mirrorless interchangeable-lens camera, which opened the range of Digital PEN models, which are still sold today. Olympus Corporation's camera division since has been bought by Japan Industrial Partners, and run under the OM Digital Solutions name. They continue to run the Digital PEN series.

General context 
The original Pen was introduced in 1959. It was designed by Yoshihisa Maitani, and was the first half-frame camera produced in Japan. It was one of the smallest cameras to use 35mm film in regular 135 cassettes.

A series of derivatives followed, some easier to use with the introduction of exposure automation, e.g. the Pen EE; others with a wider aperture lens and a manual meter, such as the Pen D.

In 1966 the arrival of the Rollei 35, a camera almost as compact but making normal 24×36 exposures, would announce the beginning of the end for the half-frame concept. However, Olympus went on producing the simpler models of the Pen family until at least 1983.

In the descriptions below, the focal lengths indicated do not give the same angle of view as for full-frame cameras: 30mm on the Pen is roughly equivalent to 45mm on a full-frame, and 28mm to a 40mm.

Pen and Pen S 
The original Pen is a very compact half-frame camera, with just a viewfinder, no meter and fully manual settings. It has a 28mm f/3.5 Zuiko lens. Its shutter settings are 25, 50, 100, 200, B; its aperture range from 3.5 to 22.  The back is removed completely for film loading and unloading.

The Pen S is almost the same camera, with the following shutter settings: 8, 15, 30, 60, 125, 250, B. It existed in two versions, with a 30mm f/2.8 lens or a 28mm f/3.5 lens.

D series 

The Pen D was a more expensive model, launched in 1962. It has a 32mm f/1.9 lens, a shutter going to 1/500 and an uncoupled selenium meter.

The Pen D2, launched in 1964, is the same model with an uncoupled CdS exposure meter replacing the selenium one.

The Pen D3, launched in 1965, is the same with a 32mm f/1.7 lens.

EE series 

The Pen EE was introduced in 1961 and was the amateur model, with fully automatic exposure and fixed focusing. It is a true point and shoot camera, and has a 28mm f/3.5 lens. The Pen EE family is easily recognized by the selenium meter window around the lens.

The Pen EE.S, launched in 1962, is the same model with a 30mm f/2.8 and a focusing ring, made necessary by the wider aperture.

In 1966 the two cameras were slightly modified and became the Pen EE (EL) and Pen EE.S (EL) with a modification of the take-up spool to make film loading easier. EL stands for Easy Loading. You can only recognize them by a small label marked EL stuck on the front, or you can open them and look at the take-up spool.

The Pen EE.2, produced from 1968 to 1977, is nearly the same as the Pen EE with the addition of a hot shoe. 

The Pen EE.3, produced from 1973 to 1983, seems to be almost exactly the same camera except that it added the "Flashmatic" system when used with the matching GN14 flash.

The Pen EE.S2, produced from 1968 to 1971, is the same as the Pen EE.S with the addition of a hot shoe.

The Pen EE.D, produced from 1967 to 1972, is a more expensive automated-exposure model, with a CdS meter, a 32mm f/1.7 lens and a hot shoe.

The Pen EF, launched in 1981, was the last Pen model. It is like the Pen EE.2 or Pen EE.3, but with a small built-in flash, and was only sold in black finish with white letterings.

Pen Wide 
The Pen W or Pen Wide is a very rare variant of the Pen S model, with a wide-angle 25mm f/2.8 lens, equivalent to a 35mm in full format. It only exists in black finish, and has a cold flash shoe. It was only produced between 1964 and 1965, and today fetches high prices on the collectors' market.

Pen EM 
The Pen EM, produced from 1965 to 1966, is a motorized Pen model. It has a 35mm f/2 lens, and a CdS exposure meter allowing automatic or manual exposure.

PEN F, PEN FT, PEN FV 

The Olympus PEN F series of cameras were half-frame SLR cameras produced between 1963 and 1970. The cameras were unique in using a rotary shutter.

Pen Rapid models 
The Pen Rapid EE.S and Pen Rapid EE.D were variants of the Pen EE.S and Pen EE.D designed to accept the Agfa Rapid cassette instead of the regular 35mm cassette. They were both made from 1965 to 1966, and met very little success.

Digital PEN 

The Digital PEN series is a wide range of mirrorless interchangeable lens digital cameras made by Olympus. They use the Micro Four Thirds system, so they all have a 17.3 x 13 mm Four Thirds size image sensor and autofocus. The first digital PEN was the E-P1, released in June 2009.

There are three lines in the Digital PEN series of Olympus: The main PEN range (E-P), the PEN Lite (E-PL) and the PEN Mini (E-PM).

Main PEN range: The Olympus PEN E-P1 was the first digital PEN and the second camera in the Micro Four Thirds system. It revolutionized the camera market, because it was the first mirrorless camera which really took advantage of its kind. It included a 12 MP Four Thirds size sensor, which had the same image quality as a Four Thirds DSLR camera, but was packed in a much smaller body. It also included a 3-axis sensor-shift image stabilization system. It carries on in the PEN tradition with its external design clearly inspired by the traditional PEN series. The next model in this category was the E-P2, released in April 2010, which did not include a whole lot of new features. One of them was the multi-functional accessory port under the hot shoe for an optional external electronic viewfinder or an external microphone. The next model to follow was the E-P3, released in 2011. It packed quite a few new features like 1080p video recording, a built-in flash, or a touch screen. Olympus claimed the E-P3 to have the world's fastest autofocus system. The next model in this range was the E-P5 from 2013. It got some of its new features from the more professional OM-D E-M5, like the new 16 MP sensor and along with it, the 5-axis sensor stabilization system, and a tilting LCD screen. It had the max. shutter speed of 1/8000s, which was a whole new feature in Olympus Micro Four Thirds cameras. After 8 years, the main E-P series got updated in 2021, now under OM Digital Solutions' leadership. They skipped the number 6, and named the camera E-P7. The E-P7 shares a lot of its internals with the OM-D E-M10 Mark IV, but the design resembles the PEN-F. It lacks an electronic viewfinder, like the previous E-P models. It cannot be used with an external viewfinder though, unlike its predecessors.

PEN Lite range: The Olympus PEN Lite range started off with the E-PL1. It was released one month after the E-P2 as a cheaper, more beginner friendly option. Their main features were identical, like the 12 MP image sensor, or the 3-axis sensor stabilization system. But there were a few corner-cuts. The E-PL1 had a fastest shutter speed of 1/2000s instead of 1/4000s, a little bit smaller LCD screen (2.7" vs 3") and   less premium material usage. The next model was the E-PL2 (2011 Q1), with a bigger and higher resolution LCD screen, then the E-PL3 (2011 Q4), with a higher, 6 fps burst rate. The E-PL5 was the first PEN Lite model to include the E-M5's 16 MP sensor, but maintaining the 3-axis image stabilization from the older cameras. The E-PL6 (2014 Q3) was not a very innovative model with the only new feature being the time lapse recording capability compared to the E-PL5. The E-PL7 was actually announced one month later with a design change, built-in Wi-Fi and a selfie-friendly higher resolution LCD screen. The E-PL8 from Q4 2016 ran with little development: the only major difference between the E-PL7 and the E-PL8 was the design. The next model was the E-PL9 (2018 Q1), where the max. ISO sensitivity was cut back from 25,600 to 6,400; however, it packed 4K video recording and reintroduced the built-in flash in the PEN Lite range. The current model in this category is the E-PL10, released in Q4 2019. It did not really include any major innovation compared to its predecessor.

PEN Mini range: The Olympus PEN Mini was a short-lived category in the digital PEN range. It is not necessarily smaller than the higher-end PEN models, but it simplifies the controls to make the camera more beginner-friendly. The first model in it was the E-PM1, released in Q4 2011. It had the same features and the same size as the E-PL3, but with a simplified button layout and ergonomics. The E-PM2 was released in Q2 2013, it had the same differences compared to the E-PL5.

There is one more model in the Digital PEN range, which does not really fit any of these categories. It is the digital PEN-F from 2016. It pays tribute to the above mentioned old PEN F half-frame SLR. These cameras look alike as well. The new PEN-F shares a lot of its features with the Olympus OM-D E-M5 Mark II, and also has a built-in electronic viewfinder, which is a unique feature among digital PEN cameras. It is still the most advanced PEN camera as of January 2021. The PEN-F was also the first Olympus camera to use the new, 20 MP sensor, which later ended up in professional bodies like the E-M1 Mark II.

In the cameras that support it, Olympus offers a mobile app called OI.Share (Olympus Image Share), which is free and can be used for taking self-portraits and share message. The app will show a live preview of your image via a Wi-Fi connection to the camera and let you control a host of camera functions from zoom to new art filters before you take the shot which will then download to your smartphone to let you post on social media.

Notes

External links

  Manual available in the Favorite Classics section of kyphoto.com
  Olympus Pen EES-2 aperture repair
  Olympus Pen at Marriott's World
  Original Pen in Karl Blessing's website
  Lionel's Olympus Pen EE-3 page at 35mm-compact.com
  Pages at Sylvain Halgand's www.collection-appareils.com:
 Pen EE
 Pen EE-2
 Pen EES-2
 Pen EES
  Half-moon, a website fully devoted to the Pen and Pen F series
 www.ccc2000.net

Pen